Sevastyanovo may refer to:
Sevastyanovo, Leningrad Oblast, a settlement in Leningrad Oblast, Russia
Sevastyanovo, Vologda Oblast, a village in Vologda Oblast, Russia